The AMD K6 microprocessor is the 2nd generation of x86-compatible 32-bit processors designed by AMD. The K6 core was derived from the NexGen Nx686 core being developed based on the RISC86 architecture.

Desktop CPU

K6 (Model 6, K6, 350 nm)

 All models support: MMX

K6 (Model 7, K6, 250 nm)

 All models support: MMX

K6-2 (Model 8, K6, 250 nm)

 All models support: MMX, 3DNow!

K6-III (Model 9, K6-III, 250 nm)

 All models support: MMX, 3DNow!

Mobile CPU

Mobile K6 (Model 7, K6, 250 nm)

 All models support: MMX

Mobile K6-2 (Model 8, K6-2, 250 nm)

 All models support: MMX, 3DNow!

Mobile K6-2+ (Model 13, K6-2+, 180 nm)

 All models support: MMX, 3DNow!

Mobile K6-III-P (Model 9, K6-III, 250 nm)

 All models support: MMX, 3DNow!

Mobile K6-III+ (Model 13, K6-III+, 180 nm)

 All models support: MMX, Enhanced 3DNow!, CnQ

Embedded CPU

Mobile K6-2E (Model 8, K6-2, 250 nm)

 All models support: MMX, 3DNow!, CnQ

K6-2E+ (Model 13, K6-2+, 180 nm)

 All models support: MMX, 3DNow!

K6-IIIE+ (Model 13, K6-III+, 180 nm)

 All models support: MMX, Enhanced 3DNow!, CnQ

References

AMD K6